The Best of Fear Factory is a best-of compilation album released on Roadrunner Records, featuring a collection of Fear Factory's music with the label (as such, Archetype and Transgression material are not included). The record was released without Fear Factory's involvement (they were signed to Liquid 8 Records at the time of the album's release), so it's unlikely that the album is officially recognized by the band themselves. Songs from Concrete, as well as their various compilation, live and remix albums, are not included.

The album was released on September 12, simultaneously with similarly unsanctioned best-of collections of the bands Sepultura, Type O Negative, and Ill Niño.

Track listing

Personnel
Burton C. Bell − vocals
Dino Cazares − guitars, bass on tracks 1−7, audio mixing
Raymond Herrera − drums
Christian Olde Wolbers − bass on tracks 8−12
Monte Conner − compilation
Joseph Cultice − photography
Rhys Fulber − keyboards, audio programming, producer, audio mixing
Caroline Greyshock − photography
Steve Harris − audio mixing
Junkie XL − mixing
Brad Miller − photography
UE Nastasi − assembly
Gary Numan − vocals on track 11
Mike Plotnikoff − mixing
Greg Reely − producer, mixing
Colin Richardson − producer, mixing
Anthony St. James − photography
Neil Zlozower − cover photo

References

Fear Factory albums
2006 greatest hits albums
Roadrunner Records compilation albums
Albums produced by Greg Reely